Tanay, officially the Municipality of Tanay, is a 1st class municipality in the province of Rizal, Philippines. According to the 2020 census, it has a population of 139,420 people.

It contains portions of the Sierra Madre Mountains and is bordered by Antipolo in the north-west, Baras, Morong and Teresa in the west, General Nakar (Quezon Province) in the east, and Pililla, Santa Maria (Laguna province) as well as the lake Laguna de Bay in the south.

It is the epicenter of the Tanay Tagalog dialect, which has the deepest modern Tagalog words in the Tagalog language and is the only endangered Tagalog dialect.

History

Tanay was settled by early Austronesian people.  Shortly after the conquest and subjugation of Manila by the Spaniards and the surrounding lake areas by Juan de Salcedo in 1570–1574, Franciscan missionaries arrived to Christianize the inhabitants of what is now the Morong-Pililla area.  In 1583, both Morong and Pililla were created as separate towns with Tanay forming part of Pililla.

Tanay was founded as a separate pueblo (town) in 1606 under the name "Monte de Tan-ay".  In 1620, administration was moved to San Antonio (now called Inalsan or Pantay) and Tandang Kutyo.  In 1638, the town was burned during an uprising of Chinese living in the area, and the town was rebuilt in 1640 at the present day location.

In 1747, the town of Tanay consisted of only eight barangays, namely Nuestra Senora del Rosario, Sa Josep, San Ildefonso de Tanay, San Francisco de Maytubig, San Pedro de Alcantara, San Lucas y San Antonio, San Apostol, and San Agustin de Balugbog.

In 1853, a new political subdivision was formed. The town of Tanay together with Morong, Baras, Pililla, Angono, Binangonan and Jalajala form the Province of La Laguna, with the capital at Morong. This district was later changed to Distrito Politico-Militar de Morong after four years.

Tanay became a Municipality in 1894 as an effect of the Spanish Maura Law. The first election of Public Office took place in 1895–1898 and 1898–1900 under the Revolutionary Government of the Philippines.

Tanay members of the Katipunan fought valiantly during the Revolution against Spain.  The town was the headquarters of the second military area of the Philippine Revolutionary Government under General Emilio Aguinaldo. And for a brief period between 1899 and 1900, Tanay served as the capital of the then Morong Province after Philippine–American War broke out and the American forces invaded the lake towns and captured Antipolo.

In 1900–1901, Tanay as was under the Government appointed by the American Military under Taft Commission. From 1903 to 1934 the town leadership was under the American rule then in 1934 Tanay was under the Commonwealth of the Philippines as the Tydings–McDuffie Act was approved on March 24, 1934, until the Philippines fell to the hands of the Japanese during the Second World War in 1942.

In 1942–1945 the Mountains of Tanay served as the Guerrilla base for 'Marking's Fil-American Guerrillas, beginning the Liberation of Tanay in March 1945 a very decorated by the Filipino soldiers of the 4th and 42nd Division of the Philippine Commonwealth Army, 4th Constabulary Regiment of the Philippine Constabulary and the recognized guerrillas against the Japanese occupation forces during World War II. General Agustin Marking is buried in a private cemetery by the road overlooking his son's farm in Sampaloc.

On June 19, 1959, Republic Act No. 2336, also known as "An Act Establishing a Summer Resort in Sampaloc, Municipality of Tanay, Province of Rizal" was approved whereas there is hereby established a summer resort in Sampaloc. The Commission on Parks and Wildlife shall issue such rules and regulations for the establishment of such resort is taken place.

In October 2003, deposed Philippine president Joseph Estrada was transferred to a rest home in Sampaloc, a mountain barangay. He remained under house arrest until he was given executive clemency by President Gloria Macapagal Arroyo.

During the Typhoon Ketsana (Ondoy) on September 26, 2009, Tanay was one of the hardest hit towns due to the rising of Laguna Lake and the flooding of Tanay River.

Geography

Barangays

Tanay is politically subdivided into 20 barangays (10 urban, 10 rural).

Climate

Demographics

The majority of the population consists of Tagalogs who live near Laguna de Bay, though there is also a significant percentage of mountain-dwelling people living in the northern portions of the municipality. The town's major trades consist of fishing, agriculture and regional commerce.

The roots of the Sambalic languages can be traced back to Tanay, where the etymologically similar Sinuana or Remontado Dumagat is still spoken in villages in the Sierra Madre mountains between Sampaloc and General Nakar, Quezon.

Economy

Government

The Municipal Council approved the P80+ million budget for the construction of the new municipal building of Tanay. The lending company will be the Landbank of the Philippines, Tanay Branch. Certain issues and debates from different sectors and influential names about the construction arose, and still now under public consultation and hearing.

Tanay Rodeo Festival 
To promote and market the town's cattle and agri-eco tourism not only within the municipality but also in the Calabarzon region, the Municipal Government of Tanay holds Tanay Rodeo every third week of January each year. The festival is also in line with the celebration of Tanay Town Fiesta. It is participated by professionals and rodeo enthusiasts, and veterinary/animal science students from renowned universities in the country.

References

External links

Tanay Profile at PhilAtlas.com
TanayGeographic.com: Contains images of Tanay, a phone directory, and other information
[ Philippine Standard Geographic Code]
Philippine Census Information
Local Governance Performance Management System

Municipalities of Rizal
Populated places on Laguna de Bay